Jaan Raudsepp (15 August 1873 in Vaalu – 16 March 1945 in Dresden, Germany) was an Estonian politician.

In 1932 he was Minister of Roads. Raudsepp fled the Soviet occupation of Estonia as a refugees in 1944 for Germany and was killed in an Allied air raid in Dresden in 1945 aged 71.

References

1873 births
1945 deaths
Government ministers of Estonia
Estonian World War II refugees
People from Otepää Parish
Deaths by airstrike during World War II
Civilians killed in World War II
Estonian emigrants to Germany